Shoufeng is a railway station on the Taiwan Railways Administration Hualien–Taitung line located in Shoufeng Township, Hualien County, Taiwan.

History
The station was opened on 16 December 1910.

See also
 List of railway stations in Taiwan

References

1910 establishments in Taiwan
Railway stations in Hualien County
Railway stations opened in 1910
Railway stations served by Taiwan Railways Administration